The tournament started in 1960, initially only champions from La Paz, Cochabamba, Oruro and Santa Cruz participated, in later years teams from other associations started joining the cup, and the tournament eventually also had runner-up's participating.

Until 1976, due to the lack of a nationwide league, the cup determined the national champion and representative teams for the Copa Libertadores. With the creation of the Liga de Fútbol Profesional Boliviano, the Bolivian FA stopped organizing the tournament.

Finally in 1989 the tournament was resurrected, with the same format of having both champions and runner-up from each association, but this time each regional league was the 2nd tier on the football pyramid so the champion was supposed to be awarded a place in the professional league. Previously the last placed team in the 1st division was replaced by the regional champion of its department. However that practice was kept until 1993 when finally the champion was awarded a spot in the top league.

The competition format changes frequently, in 2008, the team were divided into 3 groups of 6 teams each, to save costs, geographically close teams were teamed up and played on a home-away round-robin basis, with group 1 consisting of teams from La Paz, Oruro and Cochabamba; group 2 with teams from Potosí, Chuquisaca and Tarija, and group 3 with teams from Santa Cruz, Beni and Pando. The top 2 placed teams advanced to the next round, now playing play-offs on home-away basis, the 3 winners and the best loser advanced to the semifinals and then the final.

First phase

Group A

Group B

Group C

Quarter finals

|}

Semi-final
In this round Club Primero De Mayo qualified as the best loser

|}

1st Leg

2nd Leg

Final

|}

Copa Simón Bolívar, 2008